Sauris elaica is a moth of the family Geometridae. It was described by Edward Meyrick in 1886. It is found on Fiji.

References

 Sauris elaica in inhs.uiuc.edu

Moths described in 1886
Sauris (moth)